Long Point State Park – Thousand Islands is a  state park located at the northeast tip of Point Peninsula on Lake Ontario's Chaumont Bay. The park is located in the Town of Lyme in Jefferson County, New York.

The park was established by New York State in 1913 as part of the St. Lawrence Reservation.

Park description
Long Point State Park is open from early May to Columbus Day, and offers a playground, picnic tables and pavilions, showers, a boat launch, a campground with 86 sites for tents and trailers, and sheltered fishing in Chaumont Bay.

See also
 List of New York state parks

References

External links
 New York State Parks: Long Point State Park - Thousand Islands

State parks of New York (state)
Parks in Jefferson County, New York